1959 in Australian television was the fourth year of television broadcasts in Australia.

Events 
Television Broadcasts in Western Australia were aired for the first time on 15 October 1959, TVW was opened by the Governor of Western Australia, Sir Charles Gairdner.

Television broadcasts in the state of Queensland (Brisbane) were aired for the very first time, starting with the Nine Network's QTQ on 16 August, followed soon after by the Seven Network's BTQ on 1 November, and the ABC's ABQ on the next day.

The first television station in Adelaide, South Australia (NWS-9) began broadcasting on 5 September.

On 1 July, Australian children's TV series Mr. Squiggle and Friends debuts on ABC starting off as a temporary fill in. Years later the show has been so popular it continues to air on the ABC until 9 July 1999.

Melbourne and Sydney are linked by microwave for the first time on 9 January, enabling television programs to be screened, simultaneously in both cities.

Notable debuts and endings
Notable Australian series that debuted during 1959 included variety and/or music series Adelaide Tonight, The Bobby Limb Show, Six O'Clock Rock and Make Ours Music, game show Wheel of Fortune, discussion series The Critics, and short-lived drama series Emergency. Additionally, ATN-7 and GTV-9 experimented with local drama with the Shell Presents productions of plays. 

Notable series which ended in 1959 included variety and/or music series Astor Showcase, Hit Parade and Sydney Tonight (which had been re-titled and re-formatted as Tonight), drama series Autumn Affair and Emergency, and comedy series Take That.

New programming

Domestic
16 February – Emergency (Nine Network - Melbourne)
9 April – Balance Your Budget (Nine Network)
13 May – Eric Baume's Viewpoint (Nine Network)
1 July – Mr. Squiggle and Friends (ABC TV)
9 July – Rooftop Rendezvous (ABC TV)
26 July – Don't Argue (Seven Network - Melbourne)
29 July – What's On (Seven Network)
29 July – Let's Make Clothes (Seven Network)
31 July – About Your Garden (Seven Network - Melbourne)
1 November – Canberra Report (Seven Network - Sydney)
6 December – On the Spot (Nine Network - Melbourne)
29 December – New Look at New Guinea (ABC TV)

International
2 January –  The Donna Reed Show (ABC TV)
30 January/8 June –  Rescue 8 (30 January: Seven Network - Sydney, 8 June: Nine Network - Melbourne)
2 February –  Frontier Doctor (Seven Network)
5 February –  Naked City (Nine Network)
13 April –  Wanted Dead or Alive (Nine Network)
24 May –  The Adventures of William Tell (Seven Network)
7 August/4 September –  Adventures of Pow Wow (7 August: Seven Network - Sydney, 4 September: Nine Network - Melbourne)
22 August –  Bronco (Nine Network - Sydney, Seven Network - Melbourne)
31 August –  The Invisible Man (1958) (Seven Network)
12 October –  Sword of Freedom (ABC TV)
 Huckleberry Hound (Nine Network - Sydney, Seven Network - Melbourne)
 Spunky and Tadpole (Nine Network)
 Quick Draw McGraw (Nine Network - Sydney, Seven Network - Melbourne)
/ Cannonball (Nine Network)
 Tom Terrific (Nine Network - Sydney, Seven Network - Melbourne)
 77 Sunset Strip (Seven Network)
 Union Pacific (Seven Network)
 Peter Gunn (Nine Network)
 Mackenzie's Raiders (Seven Network)

Television shows

1950s
 Australian Unlimited (1956 – 1961)
 The Late Show (1957 – 1959)
 Swallow's Juniors (1957 – 1970)
 The Price is Right (1957 – 1959)
 The Happy Go Lucky Show (1957 – 1959)
 Binnie Time (1958 – 1959)
 My Fair Lady (1958 – 1962)
 That's My Desire (1958 – 1960)
 Room for Two (1958 – 1959)
 The Toppanos (1958 – 1959)
 Binnie Time (1958 – 1959)
 The Annette Klooger Show (1959 – 1961)
 Bandwagon (1959 – 1960)
 Sweet and Low (1959)
 Mr. Squiggle and Friends (1959 – 1999)
 Serenade (1959 – 1960)

Ending this year

References

See also
NWS-9